John William Willis (31 August 1886 – 21 September 1963) was an English cricketer.  Willis was a right-handed batsman, though his bowling style is unknown.  He was born at Rothwell, Northamptonshire.

Willis made a single first-class appearance for Northamptonshire against Yorkshire in the 1919 County Championship.  In Northamptonshire's first-innings he was dismissed for 4 by Roy Kilner, while in their second-innings he was dismissed by the same bowler for a duck.  With the ball, Willis bowled a total of ten wicketless overs.

He died at the town of his birth on 21 September 1963.

References

External links
John Willis at ESPNcricinfo
John Willis at CricketArchive

1886 births
1963 deaths
People from Rothwell, Northamptonshire
English cricketers
Northamptonshire cricketers